Death for Sale is a 2011 film directed by Faouzi Bensaïdi. The film was selected as the Moroccan entry for the Best Foreign Language Oscar at the 85th Academy Awards, but it did not make the final shortlist.

Plot
Drifting youngsters under the leaden sky of Tetouan, a city in northern Morocco. Malik, Allal and Soufiane, are desperate petty criminals, who try to flee a life of material and moral poverty. None of them finds a way out: Malik is in love with the prostitute Dounia and to help her accepts working with a corrupt police inspector, Allal pushes drugs and has the police hot on his heels, Soufiane gives vent to his rage by embracing the cause of fundamentalism. The three friends decide to attempt a job in a jeweller's for a last chance.

Awards
 Berlin International Film Festival 2012
 Brussels Film Festival 2012
 Moroccan National Film Festival 2012

See also
 List of submissions to the 85th Academy Awards for Best Foreign Language Film
 List of Moroccan submissions for the Academy Award for Best Foreign Language Film

References

External links
 

2011 films
Moroccan drama films
Belgian drama films
French drama films
Films set in Morocco
Films directed by Faouzi Bensaïdi
2010s French films